Bakouri Gogitidze (Georgian: ბაკური გოგიტიძე) is a Georgian mixed martial artist. He competed in the Heavyweight division.

Mixed martial arts record

|-
| Loss
| align=center| 2-4
| Mikhail Ilyukhin
| Submission (ankle lock)
| Rings: Russia vs. Georgia
| 
| align=center| 1
| align=center| 7:25
| Tula, Russia
| 
|-
| Loss
| align=center| 2-3
| Dan Henderson
| Submission (knee to the ribs)
| Rings: King of Kings 1999 Block A
| 
| align=center| 1
| align=center| 2:17
| Tokyo, Japan
| 
|-
| Win
| align=center| 2-2
| Mikhail Ilyukhin
| Submission (rear naked choke)
| Rings: Rings Georgia
| 
| align=center| 1
| align=center| 5:07
| Georgia
| 
|-
| Loss
| align=center| 1-2
| Yoshihisa Yamamoto
| N/A
| Rings: Battle Dimensions Tournament 1996 Final
| 
| align=center| 0
| align=center| 0:00
| 
| 
|-
| Win
| align=center| 1-1
| Todor Todorov
| N/A
| Rings: Battle Dimensions Tournament 1996 Opening Round
| 
| align=center| 0
| align=center| 0:00
| 
| 
|-
| Loss
| align=center| 0-1
| Mitsuya Nagai
| N/A
| Rings: Battle Dimensions Tournament 1995 Opening Round
| 
| align=center| 0
| align=center| 0:00
| 
|

See also
List of male mixed martial artists

References

External links
 
 Bakouri Gogitidze at mixedmartialarts.com
 Bakouri Gogitidze at fightmatrix.com

Male mixed martial artists from Georgia (country)
Heavyweight mixed martial artists
Living people
Year of birth missing (living people)